Billy Kennedy may refer to:

Billy Kennedy (basketball) (born 1964), former head men's basketball coach at Texas A&M University
Billy Kennedy (Neighbours), a character in the Australian soap opera Neighbours
Billy Kennedy (loyalist), see UDA West Belfast Brigade
Billy Kennedy, Scottish musician, member of Frightened Rabbit since 2006
Billy Kennedy, radio host and candidate for the U.S. House of Representatives in North Carolina in 2010

See also
Bill Kennedy (disambiguation)
William Kennedy (disambiguation)